Louis William Maxson (July 2, 1855 – July 2, 1916) was an American archer who competed in the 1904 Summer Olympics. He was born in Herbertville, California and died in Baltimore, Maryland. Maxson won the gold medal in the team competition. In the Double American round he finished twelfth and in the Double York round he finished again twelfth.

References

External links
 
 profile

1855 births
1916 deaths
American male archers
Archers at the 1904 Summer Olympics
Olympic gold medalists for the United States in archery
Medalists at the 1904 Summer Olympics
Sportspeople from California